The Bactria–Margiana Archaeological Complex (short BMAC) or Oxus Civilization, recently dated to c. 2250–1700 BC, is the modern archaeological designation for a Bronze Age civilization of Central Asia, previously dated to c. 2400–1900 BC, by Sandro Salvatori, in its urban phase or Integration Era.

Though it may be called the "Oxus civilization", apparently centred on the upper Amu Darya (Oxus River) in Bactria, most of the BMAC's urban sites are actually located in Margiana (modern Turkmenistan) on the Murghab river delta, and in the Kopet Dagh mountain range. There are a few later (c. 1950–1450 BC) sites in northern Bactria, currently known as southern Uzbekistan, but they are mostly graveyards belonging to the BMAC-related Sapalli culture. A single BMAC site, known as Dashli, lies in southern Bactria, current territory of northern Afghanistan. Sites found further east, in southwestern Tajikistan, though contemporary with the main BMAC sites in Margiana, are only graveyards, with no urban developments associated with them.

BMAC sites were discovered and named by the Soviet archaeologist Viktor Sarianidi (1976), during the period (1969–1979), when he was excavating in northern Afghanistan. Sarianidi's excavations from the late 1970s onward revealed numerous monumental structures in many sites, fortified by impressive walls and gates. Reports on the BMAC were mostly confined to Soviet journals. A journalist from The New York Times wrote in 2001 that during the years of the Soviet Union, the findings were largely unknown to the West until Sarianidi's work began to be translated in the 1990s. However, some publications by Soviet authors, like Masson, Sarianidi, Atagarryev, and Berdiev, had been available to the West since the 1970s at least.

Etymology 
The region was first named Bakhdi in Old Persian, which then formed the Persian satrapy of Marguš (perhaps from the Sumerian term Marhasi), the capital of which was Merv, in modern-day southeastern Turkmenistan. It was then called Bāxtriš in Middle Persian, and Baxl in New Persian. The region was also mentioned in ancient Sanskrit texts as बाह्लीक or Bāhlīka. The modern term Bactria is derived from the Ancient Greek: Βακτριανή (Romanized Greek term: Baktrianē) (modern Balkh), which came from the Old Persian term.

Early Food Producing Era

There is archaeological evidence of settlement in the well-watered northern foothills of the Kopet Dag during the Neolithic period at Jeitun (or Djeitun). In this region, mud brick houses were first occupied during Early Food Producing Era, also known as Jeitun Neolithic, from c. 7200 to 4600 BC.  The inhabitants were farmers with origins in southwest Asia, who kept herds of goats and sheep and grew wheat and barley. Jeitun has given its name to the whole Neolithic period in the northern foothills of the Kopet Dag. At the late Neolithic site of Chagylly Depe, farmers increasingly grew the kinds of crops that are typically associated with irrigation in an arid environment, such as hexaploid bread wheat, which became predominant during the Chalcolithic period. This region is dotted with the multi-period hallmarks characteristic of the ancient Near East, similar to those southwest of the Kopet Dag in the Gorgan Plain in Iran.

Regionalization Era

Regionalization Era begins in Anau IA with a pre-Chalcolithic phase also in the Kopet Dag piedmont region from 4600 to 4000 BC, then the Chalcolithic period develops from 4000 to 2800 BC in Namazga I-III, Ilgynly Depe, and Altyn Depe. During this Copper Age, the population of the region grew.  Archaeologist Vadim Mikhaĭlovich Masson, who led the South Turkmenistan Complex Archaeological Expedition of 1946, saw signs that people migrated to the region from central Iran at this time, bringing metallurgy and other innovations, but thought that the newcomers soon blended with the Jeitun farmers. (Vadim was the son of archaeologist Mikhail Masson, who had previously already started work in this same area.) By contrast, a re-excavation of Monjukli Depe in 2010 found a distinct break in settlement history between the late neolithic and early chalcolithic eras there.

Major chalcolithic settlements sprang up at Kara-Depe and Namazga-Depe. In addition, there were smaller settlements at Anau, Dashlyji, and Yassy-depe. Settlements similar to the early level at Anau also appeared further east– in the ancient delta of the river Tedzen, the site of the Geoksiur Oasis. About 3500 BC, the cultural unity of the area split into two pottery styles: colourful in the west (Anau, Kara-Depe and Namazga-Depe) and more austere in the east at Altyn-Depe and the Geoksiur Oasis settlements. This may reflect the formation of two tribal groups. It seems that around 3000 BC, people from Geoksiur migrated into the Murghab delta (where small, scattered settlements appeared) and reached further east into the Zerafshan Valley in Transoxiana. In both areas pottery typical of Geoksiur was in use. In Transoxiana they settled at Sarazm near Pendjikent. To the south the foundation layers of Shahr-i Shōkhta on the bank of the Helmand river in south-eastern Iran contained pottery of the Altyn-Depe and Geoksiur type. Thus the farmers of Iran, Turkmenistan and Afghanistan were connected by a scattering of farming settlements.

Late Regionalization Era
In the Early Bronze Age, at the end of Late Regionalization Era (2800 to 2400 BC), the culture of the Kopet Dag oases and Altyn-Depe developed a proto-urban society. This corresponds to level IV at Namazga-Depe. Altyn-Depe was a major centre even then. Pottery was wheel-turned. Grapes were grown.

Integration Era: Oxus Civilization
The height of the urban development was reached in the Middle Bronze Age also known as Integration Era mainly in three regions, Kopet Dag piedmont, Margiana, and southern Bactria, as well as some cemetery remains recently found in southwestern Tajikistan.

Kopet Dag, Namazga V phase

BMAC's urban period begins in the Kopet Dag piedmont, as per Massimo Vidale, corresponding to Namazga-Depe level V (c. 2400-2000 BC). Namazga Depe reaching c. 52 hectares and holding maybe 17–20,000 inhabitants, and Altyn Depe with its maximum size of c. 25 hectares and 7-10,000 inhabitants, were the two big cities in Kopet Dag piedmont. This urban development is considered to have lasted, not from 2400 BC, but from c. 2250 to 1700 BC by Lyonnet and Dubova's recent publication.

Margiana, Kelleli phase

Identification of the first large settling in Margiana was possible through excavations at Kelleli 3 and 4, and these are the type sites of Kelleli phase. Massimo Vidale (2017) considers that the Kelleli phase was characterized by the appearance of the first palatial compounds from 2400 to 2000 BC. Kelleli is located around 40 km northwest of Gonur; featuring Kelleli 3 with four hectares, characterized by towers in a double perimetral wall, four equal entrances, and houses in the southwest of the site. Kelleli 4 settlement is around three hectares, with the same characteristics in its wall. Sandro Salvatori (1998) commented that Kelleli phase began sightly later than Namazga V period.

Margiana, Gonur phase

Gonur phase was considered, by Sarianidi, as a southward movement of the previous Kelleli phase people. In the ancient region of Margiana, the site Gonur Depe is the largest of all settlements in this period and is located at the delta of Murghab river in southern Turkmenistan, with an area of around 55 hectares. An almost elliptical fortified complex, known as Gonur North includes the so-called "Monumental Palace", other minor buildings, temples and ritual places, together with the "Royal Necropolis", and water reservoirs, all dated by Italian archaeologists from around 2400 to 1900 BC. However French and Russian scholars like Lyonnet and Dubova date it to c. 2250-1700 BC.

Southern Bactria

In southern Bactria, northern Afghanistan, the site Dashly 3 is regarded to be also from Middle Bronze Age to Late Bronze Age (2300-1700 BC) occupation, but its beginning is probably later than 2300 BC, although earlier than 2000 BC, if new datings for BMAC by Lyonnet and Dubova are taken into account. The old Dashly 3 complex, sometimes identified as a palace, is a fortified rectangular 88 m x 84 m compound. The square building had massive double outer walls and in the middle of each wall was a protruding salient composed of a T-shaped corridor flanked by two L-shaped corridors.

Southwestern Tajikistan

New archaeological research has recently found at three ancient cemeteries in southwestern Tajikistan called Farkhor, Gelot (in Kulob District), and Darnajchi, ceramics influenced by Namazga IV and Namazga V transitional period from Early to Middle Bronze Age, which can suggest a presence of BMAC inhabitants in this region earlier considered out of their influx. Gelot's grave N6-13 was dated to 2203-2036 cal BC (2 sigma), and Darnajchi's grave N2-2 as 2456-2140 cal BC (2 sigma). Farkhor's cemetery is located on the right bank of Panj river, very near the Indus Civilization's site Shortughai.

Material culture

Agriculture and economy
The inhabitants of the BMAC were sedentary people who practised irrigation farming of wheat and barley. With their impressive material culture including monumental architecture, bronze tools, ceramics, and jewellery of semiprecious stones, the complex exhibits many of the hallmarks of civilisation. The complex can be compared to proto-urban settlements in the Helmand basin at Mundigak in western Afghanistan and Shahr-e Sukhteh in eastern Iran, or at Harappa and Mohenjo-daro in the Indus Valley.

Models of two-wheeled carts from c. 3000 BC found at Altyn-Depe are the earliest evidence of wheeled transport in Central Asia, though model wheels have come from contexts possibly somewhat earlier. Judging by the type of harness, carts were initially pulled by oxen, or a bull. However camels were domesticated within the BMAC. A model of a cart drawn by a camel of c. 2200 BC was found at Altyn-Depe.

Art
Fertility goddesses, named "Bactrian princesses", made from limestone, chlorite and clay reflect agrarian Bronze Age society, while the extensive corpus of metal objects point to a sophisticated tradition of metalworking. Wearing large stylised dresses, as well as headdresses that merge with the hair, "Bactrian princesses" embody the ranking goddess, character of the central Asian mythology that plays a regulatory role, pacifying the untamed forces.

Architecture
Sarianidi regards Gonur as the "capital" of the complex in Margiana throughout the Bronze Age. The palace of north Gonur measures 150 metres by 140 metres, the temple at Togolok 140 metres by 100 metres, the fort at Kelleli 3 125 metres by 125 metres, and the house of a local ruler at Adji Kui 25 metres by 25 metres. Each of these formidable structures has been extensively excavated. While they all have impressive fortification walls, gates, and buttresses, it is not always clear why one structure is identified as a temple and another as a palace. Mallory points out that the BMAC fortified settlements such as Gonur and Togolok resemble the qila, the type of fort known in this region in the historical period. They may be circular or rectangular and have up to three encircling walls. Within the forts are residential quarters, workshops and temples.

The people of the BMAC culture were very proficient at working in a variety of metals including bronze, copper, silver, and gold. This is attested through the many metal artefacts found throughout the sites.

Extensive irrigation systems have been discovered at the Geoksiur Oasis.

Writing
The discovery of a single tiny stone seal (known as the "Anau seal") with geometric markings from the BMAC site at Anau in Turkmenistan in 2000 led some to claim that the Bactria-Margiana complex had also developed writing, and thus may indeed be considered a literate civilisation. It bears five markings which are similar to Chinese "small seal" characters. The only match to the Anau seal is a small jet seal of almost identical shape from Niyä (near modern Minfeng) along the southern Silk Road in Xinjiang, originally thought to be from the Western Han dynasty but now thought to date to 700 BC.

Interactions with other cultures
BMAC materials have been found in the Indus Valley civilisation, on the Iranian Plateau, and in the Persian Gulf. Finds within BMAC sites provide further evidence of trade and cultural contacts. They include an Elamite-type cylinder seal and a Harappan seal stamped with an elephant and Indus script found at Gonur-depe. The relationship between Altyn-Depe and the Indus Valley seems to have been particularly strong. Among the finds there were two Harappan seals and ivory objects. The Harappan settlement of Shortugai in Northern Afghanistan on the banks of the Amu Darya probably served as a trading station.

There is evidence of sustained contact between the BMAC and the Eurasian steppes to the north, intensifying c. 2000 BC. In the delta of the Amu Darya where it reaches the Aral Sea, its waters were channelled for irrigation agriculture by people whose remains resemble those of the nomads of the Andronovo culture. This is interpreted as nomads settling down to agriculture, after contact with the BMAC, known as the Tazabagyab culture.  About 1900 BC, the walled BMAC centres decreased sharply in size. Each oasis developed its own types of pottery and other objects. Also pottery of the Tazabagyab-Andronovo culture to the north appeared widely in the Bactrian and Margian countryside. Many BMAC strongholds continued to be occupied and Tazabagyab-Andronovo coarse incised pottery occurs within them (along with the previous BMAC pottery) as well as in pastoral camps outside the mudbrick walls. In the highlands above the Bactrian oases in Tajikistan, kurgan cemeteries of the Vaksh and Bishkent type appeared with pottery that mixed elements of the late BMAC and Tazabagyab-Andronovo traditions. In southern Bactrian sites like Sappali Tepe too, increasing links with the Andronovo culture are seen. During the period 1700 - 1500 BCE, metal artifacts from Sappali Tepe derive from the Tazabagyab-Andronovo culture.

New research in the Murghab region, in excavations at defensive walls of Adji Kui 1, showed pastoralists present, and living on the edge of the town, as early as the second half of the Middle Bronze Age (c. 2210-1960 BC), coexisting with the BMAC population that lived in the 'citadel.'

Relationship with Indo-Iranians

The Bactria–Margiana complex has attracted attention as a candidate for those looking for the material counterparts to the Indo-Iranians (Aryans), a major linguistic branch that split off from the Proto-Indo-Europeans. Sarianidi himself advocates identifying the complex as Indo-Iranian, describing it as the result of a migration from southwestern Iran. Bactria–Margiana material has been found at Susa, Shahdad, and Tepe Yahya in Iran, but Lamberg-Karlovsky does not see this as evidence that the complex originated in southeastern Iran. "The limited materials of this complex are intrusive in each of the sites on the Iranian Plateau as they are in sites of the Arabian peninsula."

A significant section of the archaeologists are more inclined to see the culture as begun by farmers in the Near Eastern Neolithic tradition, but infiltrated by Indo-Iranian speakers from the Andronovo culture in its late phase, creating a hybrid. In this perspective, Proto-Indo-Aryan developed within the composite culture before moving south into the Indian subcontinent.

The Andronovo, BMAC and Yaz cultures have often been associated with Indo-Iranian migrations. As James P. Mallory phrased it:

According to Narasimshan et a. (2018) BMAC was not a primary contributor to later South-Asian genetics.

Possible evidence for a BMAC substratum in Indo-Iranian 
As argued by Michael Witzel and Alexander Lubotsky, there is a proposed substratum in Proto-Indo-Iranian which can be plausibly identified with the original language of the BMAC. Moreover, Lubotsky points out a larger number of words apparently borrowed from the same language, which are only attested in Indo-Aryan and therefore evidence of a substratum in Vedic Sanskrit. He explains this by proposing that Indo-Aryan speakers probably formed the vanguard of the movement into south-central Asia and many of the BMAC loanwords which entered Iranian may have been mediated through Indo-Aryan. Michael Witzel points out that the borrowed vocabulary includes words from agriculture, village and town life, flora and fauna, ritual and religion, so providing evidence for the acculturation of Indo-Iranian speakers into the world of urban civilisation.

Horses 
In excavations at Gonur Depe, at a brick-lined burial pit, grave number 3200 of the Royal necropolis, a horse skeleton was found in period I, dated around 2200 BCE along with a four-wheeled wooden wagon with bronze rims. Archaeologist Julio Bendezu-Sarmiento, mentioning N. A. Dubova's (2015) article, comments that this was an "almost complete skeleton of a foal" resting on the wagon with "wheels circled by bronze bands" and radiocarbon-dated to 2250 BCE. So he considers this horse and the wagon are "one and a half century prior" to similar burials of Sintashta culture. A stone statuette that seems to be a horse with saddle was found in burial number 3210 also in the Royal necropolis and was reported by Sarianidi in 2005, and in burial 3310 parts of a stallion's body were found, the stallion lacked its head, rump, and tail, and was considered as a cult burial of a domestic horse by archaeologist Sarianidi in his 2008 publication.

Genetics 
In 2018, Narasimhan and co-authors analyzed BMAC skeletons from the Bronze Age sites of Bustan, Dzharkutan, Gonur Tepe, and Sapalli Tepe. The male specimens belonged to haplogroup E1b1a (1/18), E1b1b (1/18), G (2/18), J* (2/18), J1 (1/18), J2 (4/18), L (2/18), R* (1/18), R1b (1/18), R2 (2/18), and T (1/18).

A follow-up study by Narasimhan and co-authors (2019) suggested the primary BMAC population largely derived from preceding local Copper Age peoples who were in turn related to prehistoric farmers from the Iranian plateau and to a lesser extent early Anatolian farmers and hunter-gatherers from Western Siberia, and they did not contribute substantially to later populations further south in the Indus Valley. They found no evidence that the samples extracted from the BMAC sites derived any part of their ancestry from Yamnaya culture people, who are seen as Proto-Indo-Europeans in the Kurgan hypothesis, the most influential theory on the Proto-Indo-European homeland.

A recent genetic study authored by Perle Guarino-Vignon et al., published in 2022, confirms the admixture between local BMAC groups and Andronovo-related populations, at the end of Oxus Civilization. This paper considers current Yaghnobi people, who live near Zeravshan river, Tajikistan, are descendants from Andronovo-like people which took over BMAC around 1800 to 1500 BC.

Sites
In Afghanistan:

Dashli, Jowzjan province
Khush Tepe (Tepe Fullol)

In Turkmenistan:
Altyndepe
Gonur Tepe
Jeitun
Namazga-Tepe
Togolok 21
Ulug Depe
Berdysyčran-depe

In Uzbekistan:
Ayaz Kala
Djarkutan
Koi Krylgan Kala
Sappali tepe
Toprak-Kala

See also

 Indra
 Soma
 Zoroaster
 Vakhsh culture

References

Sources

Further reading

Aruz, Joan (ed), Art of the First Cities: The Third Millennium B.C. from the Mediterranean to the Indus,  pp. 347–375, 2003, Metropolitan Museum of Art (New York, N.Y.), google books (fully online)
 
CNRS, L'archéologie de la Bactriane ancienne, actes du colloque Franco-soviétique n° 20. Paris: Editions du Centre National de la Recherche Scientifique, 1985, 

Forizs, L. (2016, 2003) Apāṁ Napāt, Dīrghatamas and Construction of the Brick Altar. Analysis of RV 1.143 in the homepage of Laszlo Forizs

External links
Black Sands – A documentary about the Gonur Tepe archaeological site
Sarianidi archaeological expedition at Gonur Tepe archaeological site

Archaeological cultures of Central Asia
Bronze Age cultures of Asia
Archaeological cultures in Afghanistan
Archaeological cultures in Tajikistan
Archaeological cultures in Turkmenistan
Archaeological cultures in Uzbekistan
Archaeological sites in Central Asia
Bronze Age sites in Asia
Archaeological sites in Afghanistan
Ancient history of Afghanistan
Archaeological sites in Turkmenistan
23rd-century BC establishments